Henri Mikael Karjalainen (born February 19, 1986, in Helsinki) is a Finnish racing driver. He raced in the GT Finnish Championship in 2010. Karjalainen is managed by Finnish Sport Management Agency SportElite.

Career

Karting
Karjalainen competed in karting from 2000 to 2003.

Single-seaters

Formula BMW
Karjalainen moved up to German Formula BMW for 2004, and stayed in the same series for 2005. He scored a total of five points from his two years in the series.

Asian-based series
Karjalainen moved to Asia for 2006, competing in both the Formula Three and Formula Renault series based in the continent. He achieved greater success, and finished as runner-up in the 2007 Asian F3 standings.

GP2 Series
Karjalainen was given the opportunity to compete in the GP2 Series in 2007 by the BCN Competicion team, following a shoulder injury to compatriot Markus Niemelä which prevented him from driving. He made his debut at Istanbul Park, failing to finish in the both races. He was replaced by the recovered Niemelä for the next race meeting.

Atlantic Championship
Karjalainen moved to North America in 2008 to compete in the Atlantic Championship.  He raced for Jensen MotorSport finishing 17th in overall standings with 10th position in Grand Prix de Trois-Rivière being his best individual finish.

Formula Two
In 2009, Karjalainen participated in the reformed Formula Two series. He is keen to be the next Finn after Keke Rosberg that promotes from Formula Two to Formula One. He drove the #23 car, finishing fifteenth in the championship.

GT Racing

Back to Finland
In 2010, after failing to collect budget large enough to compete in F2, Karjalainen returned to Finland to drive for Ferrari Team Nurminen, which competes in GT Finnish Championship with Ferrari F430 Challenge GT3 Cup. This is the first time Karjalainen has competed in GT-racing.

Racing record

Complete GP2 Series results
(key) (Races in bold indicate pole position) (Races in italics indicate fastest lap)

Complete Atlantic Championship Series results
(Races in bold indicate pole position) (Races in italics indicate fastest lap)

Complete FIA Formula Two Championship results
(key) (Races in bold indicate pole position) (Races in italics indicate fastest lap)

References

Career statistics from driverdb.com. Retrieved on August 23, 2007.
Henri Karjalainen joins Formula Two.  from formulatwo.com. Retrieved on February 16, 2009.
SportElite

External links
More information about Henri on SportElite 
Karjalainen's official website

1986 births
Living people
Sportspeople from Helsinki
Finnish racing drivers
Asian Formula Renault Challenge drivers
Formula Renault 2.0 NEC drivers
Sweden Formula Renault 2.0 drivers
Finland Formula Renault 2.0 drivers
GP2 Series drivers
Atlantic Championship drivers
FIA Formula Two Championship drivers
Formula BMW ADAC drivers
Formula Renault 2.0 NEZ drivers
Asian Formula Three Championship drivers
Asia Racing Team drivers
Team Rosberg drivers